Gustav Nikolaus Tiedemann (February 17, 1808 Landshut, Bavaria - August 11, 1849 Rastatt) was a German soldier who joined the revolutionaries during the Revolutions of 1848 in Germany, eventually becoming the commander of the last holdout of the revolution, the fortress at Rastatt.

Biography
He was the son of Friedrich Tiedemann,
an eminent anatomist and physiologist and professor at the University of Heidelberg.
After completing high
school in Mannheim, on a suggestion from an uncle, he attended a military
school. From there, he worked his way up to appointments as regimental
adjutant in two locations in succession. Then he entered veterinary school
and was trained in English at the royal stables in Hannover. Through
conflicts with superiors, he ended up in prison and resigned from the service
in 1833.  He then entered the Greek service as an under officer and again
became a regimental adjutant and finally director of the military school in
Piræus. Then a change of administration in 1843 deprived all
foreigners of their posts, and having a Greek wife, he looked to find another
occupation in Greece.  This was unsuccessful, and in 1847 he returned to
Germany hoping to find something in the postal or railroad service. This did
not work out either, and his wife started getting homesick, so he returned to
Greece in 1848, shortly after inducing some peasants to lay down their arms in
Heidelberg. Again he failed to find an occupation in Greece.

After a year,
in 1849, he was in Baden thinking of entering the Schleswig-Holstein service.
Instead he became a revolutionary, his younger brother having married a sister
of Friedrich Hecker. He was appointed a major and belonged to the staffs of Franz Sigel and
Ludwig Mieroslawski. He took part in a battle near Neckar, but then went to Karlsruhe
as he did not feel well. There he displeased Mieroslawski by seeking the
discharge of incapable adventurers from the service. He was put into custody
and taken to Rastatt. Once the defense against the Prussians had failed
outside the fortress on June 30 — the same day Carl Schurz entered the
fortress — Sigel appointed him as fortress commander. Sigel himself
evacuated with the rest of the unsuccessful revolutionary army. Tiedemann's
duties mostly consisted in suppressing the residents and soldiers who wanted
to surrender the fortress.

After the surrender
he was tried by a Prussian court martial and shot.
Prussia visited a similar punishment on his brother.

See also
 Otto von Corvin (another, and somewhat more fortunate, inhabitant of the fortress of Rastatt during Tiedemann's administration)

References

 

19th-century German military personnel
German revolutionaries
People of the Revolutions of 1848
1808 births
1849 deaths
People from Landshut
People executed by firing squad
Executed people from Bavaria